The 2023 Georgian protests were a series of street demonstrations taking place throughout Georgia over parliamentary backing of a proposed "Law on Transparency of Foreign Influence", which requires NGOs to register as "agents of foreign influence" if the funds they receive from abroad amount to more than 20% of their total revenue. Police have been reported as using water cannons and tear gas to disperse the protests, especially in the capital Tbilisi. The parliament retracted the bill as a result of protests on 10 March 2023.

Background

, Georgia and Ukraine were preparing to formally apply for EU membership in 2024 to join the European Union in the 2030s. However, amid the 2022 escalation of the Russo-Ukrainian War, Ukraine, Georgia, and Moldova jointly applied for EU membership in February and March 2022. On 23 June 2022, the European Council granted Ukraine and Moldova the status of a candidate for accession to the European Union. However, it deferred giving candidate status to Georgia until certain conditions were met. The European Council expressed readiness to grant Georgia the status of a candidate for accession to the European Union after a set of recommended reforms. On 9 June 2022, the European Parliament issued a six-page resolution accusing the government of Georgia of eroding press freedom in the country. It also recommended the European Union to sanction the founder of the ruling Georgian Dream party Bidzina Ivanishvili for "his role in the deterioration of the political process in Georgia." On 28 June 2022, the Parliamentary Assembly of the Council of Europe published a declaration, in which they have said that the imprisoned former president Mikheil Saakashvili had to be treated immediately in a special institution abroad. Saakashvili, who left Georgia in 2013 and was condemned by the Tbilisi City Court to six years in prison in absentia for abuse of power, embezzlement, and his implication in the attempted murder of an opposition MP, announced his return to Georgia on 1 October 2021, on the eve of the local elections. He was later arrested in Tbilisi. According to the investigation, Saakashvili entered the country secretly, hiding in a semi-trailer truck loaded with milk products. He illegally crossed the state border of Georgia, bypassing the customs control. He was placed in Rustavi prison and announced a hunger strike. His personal doctor asked authorities to move him to a hospital as he continued with his hunger strike as his health condition had allegedly worsened since his arrest. On 14 December 2022, the European Parliament again called the European Council to sanction Ivanishvili, accusing him of deteriorating the democratic political process in Georgia, while calling the Georgian government to release Saakashvili on medical grounds to be treated abroad. On 14 February, 2023, the European Parliament adopted a third non-binding resolution, accusing the Georgian government and Bidzina Ivanishvili of mistreating Mikheil Saakashvili in prison, once again calling for his release from prison and personal sanctions on Ivanishvili.

The Georgian Dream party responded to the resolutions with criticism. Prime Minister Irakli Garibashvili called the resolutions "irresponsible and offensive towards our people". Georgian Dream parliamentarian Dimitri Khundadze questioned Georgia's policy of EU membership, saying, "We won't give up our dignity to get [candidate] status! [...] No one will intimidate Bidzina Ivanishvili or the Georgian state with threats of sanctions!".  

On 2 August, Georgian MPs Sozar Subari, Mikheil Kavelashvili and Dimitri Khundadze left the ruling Georgian Dream and established the People's Power movement. According to the MPs, their goal was to speak up and expose the truth "hidden behind the scenes of Georgian politics". Members of People's Power published a number of public letters accusing the United States and European Union of trying to overthrow the Georgian government. The movement has notably criticized the United States foreign policy in Georgia. Its members have questioned US funding for Georgia, saying that it only served to strengthen American interests in Georgia at the expense of Georgia's state institutions and sovereignty. The People's Power movement has accused the United States and European Union of interfering in the country's internal affairs and undermining the Georgian judiciary. Judical reforms were among the 12 requests made by the European Union for Georgia to get the EU candidate status, although according to People's Power, the proposal was aimed at "subjugating the Georgian judiciary to foreign control". The movement has accused a number of Georgian political parties (including the largest opposition party United National Movement, led by Mikheil Saakashvili) and NGOs of being "American agents". According to the People's Power movement, Saakashvili illegally returned to Georgia to stage a coup, and supported by the United States and MEPs. The members of People's Power further elaborated that the United States Embassy in Georgia was working to drag the country into the Russo-Ukrainian War, and that the Georgian government and Ivanishvili were punished by the European Parliament for the peaceful policy and refusal to open a "second front" against Russia in Georgia. Georgian Dream disapproved of this criticism of the US involvement in Georgia, with Irakli Garibashvili saying that the United States and European Union are Georgia's "strategic partners". Meanwhile six other deputies joined the movement from the Georgian Dream, depriving it of its parliamentary majority. At the same time, the nine members of the People's Power movement in parliament decided to remain in the ruling majority, supporting the government of Irakli Garibashvili. The Georgian Dream chairperson Irakli Kobakhidze pledged to cooperate with People's Power on key issues.

On 29 December, the People's Power movement has expressed its intention to draft a foreign agent law to curb the foreign influence in the country. On 15 February, 2023, the draft "Law On Transparency of Foreign Influence" was submitted to Georgian Parliament.

The bills
Under the bill, non-commercial legal entities (the most common form of NGO in Georgia), broadcasters, legal entities that alone or jointly own a print media outlet operating in Georgia, and legal entities that own or use, jointly or with others, an internet domain and/or internet hosting intended for the dissemination of information through the internet in the Georgian language, must register in public registry as "agents of foreign influence" and be subjected to the monitoring of the Ministry of Justice, if they receive more than 20% of their annual income from "a foreign power". The draft law requires NGOs to disclose the source of their funds but does not imposes any restriction on their activities. The Georgian Dream supported the bill, saying that it would promote the financial transparency of foreign-funded NGOs.

Spokesman for the United States Department of State Ned Price criticized the bill and likened it to Hungarian and Russian foreign agent laws. Civil society organizations objected to the bill as a violation of fundamental human rights such as freedom of press. In response, the People's Power movement said that the bill was based on the "American model". Georgian Dream leader Irakli Kobakhidze criticized both the US and Russian laws. He said that the Georgian draft law was based on the US law but it was significantly softened to meet the standards of the European Court of Human Rights, adding that if the US law was transferred to the European space, it would be in conflict with the European human rights standards. Critics said that the bill represented an authoritarian shift and could have hurt Georgia's hopes of European Union membership. The US Embassy in Georgia said that the bill was Kremlin-inspired and was incompatible with the people of Georgia's clear desire for European integration and democratic development. The statement said that the law would have damaged Georgia's relations with its strategic partners. European Union foreign policy head Josep Borrell said that the draft law was a "very bad development" for the Georgia and its people. He said that the bill risked having a chilling effect on civil society and media organizations. Borrell stated that the bill could have seriously affected Georgian ties with the EU, and called for Georgia to uphold its commitment to the promotion of democracy. The US and the European Union stated that it would be hard for Georgia to join NATO or the European Union if the bill became law. International organizations voiced concerns over the bill, saying that the bill would have worked against Georgia's democratic development. 

Irakli Kobakhidze said that the Parliament would send the bill to the Venice Commission for recommendations and to prove that it is compatible with European standards.

Responding to criticism that the draft law was based on Russian rather than American legislation, People's Power additionally registered the alternative bill, which is direct translation of the US law. The second of the two bills includes the scope of the first bill to include individuals and extends penalties to include up to five years' imprisonment.

Timeline
On 6 March 2023, a fight broke out between parliamentary deputies of the ruling coalition and the opposition during the Legal Affairs Committee hearing on the draft laws. The protests were held in front of the Parliament building calling the deputies to vote down the bills.

On 7 March 2023, the parliament adopted a proposed "Law On Transparency of Foreign Influence" in the first reading, with 76 votes to 13. The protests were organized in front of the Parliament of Georgia, which later turned violent as the protesters tried to storm the building and threw molotov cocktails at law enforcement. Police officers used tear gas and water cannons against the protesters.

On 8 March 2023, tens of thousands of people protested in front of the parliament building, calling the parliament to suspend further discussions on the foreign agents law.

On 9 March 2023, the ruling coalition announced the they would retract the bills. They said that more discussions with the public were required to convince the society of the importance of the legislation.

The Interior Ministry announced later that day that all persons arrested on 7 and 8 March have been released.

On 10 March 2023, one of the two bills was withdrawn by the ruling coalition, while the other was defeated in a formal second sitting vote in Parliament, with one vote in favour, 36 votes against, and 76 abstentions.

Reactions

Government of Georgia 
The President of Georgia, Salome Zourabichvili, threw her support behind the protesters, saying "the path of European integration must be protected". She has said she would veto and repeal the bill.

Georgian Prime Minister Irakli Garibashvili on 7 March reaffirmed his support for the law, saying the proposed provisions on foreign agents met "European and global standards".

Georgia's Interior Ministry asked protesters to disperse, warning that "legal measures" would be taken to restore calm. The ministry reportedly said the protest went beyond the framework of a peaceful assembly and turned into violence. The ministry also said that police were also forced to use proportional force to restore public order.

More than 60 civil society organisations and media outlets have said they will not comply with the bill if it is signed into law.

United States 
Ned Price supported the protests and said that "the United States has tools to hold accountable those who contradict the will of Georgian people", hinting at potential sanctions on Georgian officials.

Russia 
Maria Zakharova criticized the European Union's position regarding situation in Georgia and accused Josep Borrell of "crossing the limits of decency" and "putting pressure on Georgian citizens".

The Minister for Foreign Affairs of Russia, Sergey Lavrov compared the situation in Georgia to Euromaidan in Ukraine. The Ministry of Foreign Affairs of the Russian Federation warned Georgians on consequences of such developments.

Russian President Vladimir Putin's press secretary Dmitry Peskov said that Russia had nothing to do with the bill and that it was more similar to Foreign Agents Registration Act of USA. He also added that Russia was monitoring situation and that it was interested that the situation remained peaceful near its border.

The Russian Ministry of Economic Development recommended Russian citizens to refrain from travelling to Georgia.

Margarita Simonyan said that Russia would immediately bomb Tbilisi if Georgia was to open "second front" against Russia.

Abkhazia
The Minister for Foreign Affairs of Abkhazia, Inal Ardzinba, stated that the United States was trying to carry out a coup in Georgia in order to destabilize the region and launch a "second front" of the Russo-Ukrainian War in the South Caucasus.

Further reading 
 The 8th of March in Tbilisi: The "Laws Story" — Opinions of Georgian NGO leaders published by Caucasian Journal, 10.03.2023.

References

2023 protests
2020s in Tbilisi
Protests
2023
Georgia (country)–Russia relations